Strings Attached is an album by multi-instrumentalist Ira Sullivan which was recorded in January and July 1982, and May 1983, in Miami, Florida. The album was first released on the Miami-based label Strings Attached in 1983. The record was subsequently reissued on the Pausa label in 1985 (Catalog No.: PR 7169). The record was released on CD with three additional tracks by Unicorn Productions in 1996, under the title "Strings Attached – Update!"

Reception 

The AllMusic review by Scott Yanow stated "This obscure LP features Sullivan on trumpet, flugelhorn and flute joined by saxophonist John Alexander, a rhythm section and a string quartet. Sullivan and the younger players perform six group originals that emphasize the lyrical side of the great multi-instrumentalist and effectively blend together the strings with the jazz ensemble".

LP Track listing 
The track listing of the original LP is as follows:

CD Track listing 
The track listing of the Unicorn Productions CD "Strings Attached – Update!" is as follows:

Personnel 
 Ira Sullivan – flute, alto flute, trumpet, flugelhorn
 John Alexander – soprano saxophone, tenor saxophone, flute, alto flute
 Laurie Haines – cello
 Peter Einhorn – electric guitar, acoustic guitar
 Nicole Yarling – violin, vocals
 Nancy Nosal – violin
 Debbie Spring – viola
 David Einhorn – bass
 Don Militello - Piano
 David Murphy ("Looking Glass Falls"), Gavin Davies ("Late Nights"), John Yarling – drums
 Robert Thomas, Jr. – hand drums

References 

Pausa Records albums
Ira Sullivan albums
1982 albums